The Beta Press d.o.o., or more commonly the Beta News Agency, is a Serbian news media agency headquartered in Belgrade, the capital of Serbia. It was established in 1992.

History
It was established on 19 March 1992 with aim to "provide full and objective coverage of events in the country (Serbia) and the region of Southeast Europe".

In 2000, the agency was fined by the government (the Federal Republic of Yugoslavia under Slobodan Milošević) for publishing anti-establishment materials. The agency was fined 150,000 dinars (approx. US$12,860 or €13,630 at the time), and the agency's director and chief editor were each fined 80,000 dinars (approx. US$6,860 or €7,270 at the time). The fines were denounced by Reporters Without Borders. Over the time, it has received funds from the National Endowment for Democracy.

Ownership
The following organizations and individuals compose the ownership structure:
 Radomir Diklić 
 Ljubica Marković 
 Dragan Janjić 
 Branislava Nikšić 
 Julija Bogoev-Ostojić 
 Dušan Reljić 
 Beta Press d.o.o. 
 Media Investment Loan Fund 
 Zlata Kureš 
 Ivan Cvejić

See also
 Media agencies in Serbia

References

External links
 

Mass media companies established in 1992
Companies based in Belgrade
News agencies based in Serbia
Mass media in Belgrade
1992 establishments in Serbia